Jewish philosophy includes all philosophy carried out by Jews, or in relation to the religion of Judaism. Until modern Haskalah (Jewish Enlightenment) and Jewish emancipation, Jewish philosophy was preoccupied with attempts to reconcile coherent new ideas into the tradition of Rabbinic Judaism, thus organizing emergent ideas that are not necessarily Jewish into a uniquely Jewish scholastic framework and world-view. With their acceptance into modern society, Jews with secular educations embraced or developed entirely new philosophies to meet the demands of the world in which they now found themselves.

Medieval re-discovery of ancient Greek philosophy among the Geonim of 10th century Babylonian academies brought rationalist philosophy into Biblical-Talmudic Judaism. The philosophy was generally in competition with Kabbalah. Both schools would become part of classic rabbinic literature, though the decline of scholastic rationalism coincided with historical events which drew Jews to the Kabbalistic approach. For Ashkenazi Jews, emancipation and encounter with secular thought from the 18th century onwards altered how philosophy was viewed. Ashkenazi and Sephardi communities had later more ambivalent interaction with secular culture than in Western Europe. In the varied responses to modernity, Jewish philosophical ideas were developed across the range of emerging religious movements. These developments could be seen as either continuations of or breaks from the canon of rabbinic philosophy of the Middle Ages, as well as the other historical dialectic aspects of Jewish thought, and resulted in diverse contemporary Jewish attitudes to philosophical methods.

Ancient Jewish philosophy

Philosophy in the Bible 

Rabbinic literature sometimes views Abraham as a philosopher. Some have suggested that Abraham introduced a philosophy learned from Melchizedek; further, some Jews ascribe the Sefer Yetzirah "Book of Creation" to Abraham.  A midrash describes how Abraham understood this world to have a creator and director by comparing this world to "a house with a light in it", what is now called the argument from design.  Psalms contains invitations to admire the wisdom of God through his works; from this, some scholars suggest, Judaism harbors a Philosophical under-current. Ecclesiastes is often considered to be the only genuine philosophical work in the Hebrew Bible; King Solomon, its author, seeks to understand the place of human beings in the world and life's meaning.

Philo of Alexandria 

Philo attempted to fuse and harmonize Greek and Jewish philosophy through allegory, which he learned from Jewish exegesis and Stoicism. Philo attempted to make his philosophy the means of defending and justifying Jewish religious truths. These truths he regarded as fixed and determinate, and philosophy was used as an aid to truth, and a means of arriving at it. To this end Philo chose from philosophical tenets of Greeks, refusing those that did not harmonize with Judaism such as Aristotle's doctrine of the eternity and indestructibility of the world.

Dr. Bernard Revel, in dissertation on Karaite halakha, points to writings of a 10th-century Karaite, Jacob Qirqisani, who quotes Philo, illustrating how Karaites made use of Philo's works in development of Karaite Judaism. Philo's works became important to Medieval Christian scholars who leveraged the work of Karaites to lend credence to their claims that "these are the beliefs of Jews" - a technically correct, yet deceptive, attribution.

Jewish scholarship after destruction of Second Temple 
With the Roman destruction of the Second Temple in 70 CE, Second Temple Judaism was in disarray, but Jewish traditions were preserved especially thanks to the shrewd maneuvers of Johanan ben Zakai, who saved the Sanhedrin and moved it to Yavne. Philosophical speculation was not a central part of Rabbinic Judaism, although some have seen the Mishnah as a philosophical work. Rabbi Akiva has also been viewed as a philosophical figure. 
His statements include: 
 "How favored is man, for he was created after an image. For in an image, Elohim made man." (Gen. ix. 6)
 "Everything is foreseen; but freedom [of will] is given to every man."
 "The world is governed by mercy... but the divine decision is made by the preponderance of the good or bad in one's actions."

After the Bar Kokhba revolt, rabbinic scholars gathered in Tiberias and Safed to re-assemble and re-assess Judaism, its laws, theology, liturgy, beliefs and leadership structure. In 219 CE, the Sura Academy (from which Jewish Kalam emerged many centuries later) was founded by Abba Arika. For the next five centuries, Talmudic academies focused upon reconstituting Judaism and little, if any, philosophic investigation was pursued.

Who influences whom? 

Rabbinic Judaism had limited philosophical activity until it was challenged by Islam, Karaite Judaism, and Christianity—with Tanach, Mishnah, and Talmud, there was no need for a philosophic framework.  From an economic viewpoint, Radhanite trade dominance was being usurped by coordinated Christian and Islamic forced-conversions, and torture, compelling Jewish scholars to understand nascent economic threats.  These investigations triggered new ideas and intellectual exchange among Jewish and Islamic scholars in the areas of jurisprudence, mathematics, astronomy, logic and philosophy.  Jewish scholars influenced Islamic scholars and Islamic scholars influenced Jewish scholars.  Contemporary scholars continue to debate who was Muslim and who was Jew—some "Islamic scholars" were "Jewish scholars" prior to forced conversion to Islam, some Jewish scholars willingly converted to Islam, such as Abdullah ibn Salam, while others later reverted to Judaism, and still others, born and raised as Jews, were ambiguous in their religious beliefs such as ibn al-Rawandi, although they lived according to the customs of their neighbors.

Around 700 CE, ʿAmr ibn ʿUbayd Abu ʿUthman al-Basri introduces two streams of thought that influence Jewish, Islamic and Christian scholars:
Qadariyah
 Bahshamiyya Muʿtazila

The story of the Bahshamiyya Muʿtazila and Qadariyah is as important, if not more so, as the intellectual symbiosis of Judaism and Islam in Islamic Spain.

Around 733 CE, Mar Natronai ben Habibai moves to Kairouan, then to Spain, transcribing the Talmud Bavli for the Academy at Kairouan from memory—later taking a copy with him to Spain.

Karaism 

Borrowing from the Mutakallamin of Basra, the Karaites were the first Jewish group to subject Judaism to Muʿtazila. Rejecting the Talmud and rabbinical tradition, Karaites took liberty to reinterpret the Tanakh. This meant abandoning foundational Jewish belief structures. Some scholars suggest that the major impetus for the formation of Karaism was a reaction to the rapid rise of Shi'i Islam, which recognized Judaism as a fellow monotheistic faith but claimed that it detracted from monotheism by deferring to rabbinic authority. Karaites absorbed certain aspects of Jewish sects such as the followers of Abu Isa (Shi'ism), Maliki (Sunnis) and Yudghanites (Sufis), who were influenced by East-Islamic scholarship yet deferred to the Ash'ari when contemplating the sciences.

Philosophic synthesis begins 

The spread of Islam throughout the Middle East and North Africa rendered Muslim all that was once Jewish.  Greek philosophy, science, medicine and mathematics was absorbed by Jewish scholars living in the Arab world due to Arabic translations of those texts; remnants of the Library of Alexandria.  Early Jewish converts to Islam brought with them stories from their heritage, known as Isra'iliyyat, which told of the Banu Isra'il, the pious men of ancient Israel.  One of the most famous early mystics of Sufism, Hasan of Basra, introduced numerous Isra'iliyyat legends into Islamic scholarship, stories that went on to become representative of Islamic mystical ideas of piety of Sufism.

Hai Gaon of Pumbedita Academy begins a new phase in Jewish scholarship and investigation (hakirah); Hai Gaon augments Talmudic scholarship with non-Jewish studies.  Hai Gaon was a savant with an exact knowledge of the theological movements of his time so much so that Moses ibn Ezra called him a mutakallim.  Hai was competent to argue with followers of Qadariyyah and Mutazilites, sometimes adopting their polemic methods.  Through correspondence with Talmudic Academies at Kairouan, Cordoba and Lucena, Hai Gaon passes along his discoveries to Talmudic scholars therein.

The teachings of the Brethren of Purity were carried to the West by the Cordovan hadith scholar and alchemist Maslama al-Qurṭubī (died 964), where they would be of central importance to the Jewish philosophers of Islamic Spain. One of the themes emphasized by the Brethren of Purity and adopted by most Spanish Jewish philosophers is the microcosm-macrocosm analogy. From the 10th century on, Spain became a center of philosophical learning as is reflected by the explosion of philosophical inquiry among Jews, Muslims and Christians.

Jewish philosophy before Maimonides

"Hiwi the Heretic" 
According to Sa'adya Gaon, the Jewish community of Balkh (Afghanistan) was divided into two groups: "Jews" and "people that are called Jews"; Hiwi al-Balkhi was a member of the latter.  Hiwi is generally considered to be the very first "Jewish" philosopher to subject the Pentateuch to critical analysis.  Hiwi is viewed by some scholars as an intellectually conflicted man torn between Judaism, Zoroastrianism, Gnostic Christianity, and Manichaean thought.

Hiwi espoused the belief that miraculous acts, described in the Pentateuch, are simply examples of people using their skills of reasoning to undertake, and perform, seemingly miraculous acts.  As examples of this position, he argued that the parting of the Red Sea was a natural phenomenon, and that Moses' claim to greatness lay merely in his ability to calculate the right moment for the crossing.  He also emphasized that the Egyptian magicians were able to reproduce several of Moses' "miracles," proving that they could not have been so unique.  According to scholars, Hiwi's gravest mistake was having the Pentateuch redacted to reflect his own views - then had those redacted texts, which became popular,  distributed to children.  Since his views contradicted the views of both Rabbanite and Karaite scholars, Hiwi was declared a heretic.  In this context, however, we can also regard Hiwi, while flawed, as the very first critical biblical commentator; zealous rationalistic views of Hiwi parallel those of Ibn al-Rawandi.

Saʿadya Gaon dedicated an entire treatise, written in rhyming Hebrew, to a refutation of Ḥīwī's arguments, two fragments of which, preserved in the Cairo Geniza, have been published (Davidson, 1915; Schirmann, 1965). Ḥīwī's criticisms are also noted in Abraham ibn Ezra's commentary on the Pentateuch.  Sa'adya Gaon denounced Hiwi as an extreme rationalist, a "Mulhidun", or atheist/deviator.  Abraham Ibn Daud described HIwi as a sectarian who "denied the Torah, yet used it to formulate a new Torah of his liking".

Sa'adya Gaon 
Saadia Gaon, son of a proselyte, is considered the greatest early Jewish philosopher after Solomon. During his early years in Tulunid Egypt, the Fatimid Caliphate ruled Egypt; the leaders of the Tulunids were Ismaili Imams.  Their influence upon the Jewish academies of Egypt resonate in the works of Sa'adya.  Sa'adya's Emunoth ve-Deoth ("Beliefs and Opinions") was originally called Kitab al-Amanat wal-l'tikadat ("Book of the Articles of Faith and Doctrines of Dogma"); it was the first systematic presentation and philosophic foundation of the dogmas of Judaism, completed at Sura Academy in 933 CE.

Little known is that Saadia traveled to Tiberias in 915CE to study with Abū 'l-Kathīr Yaḥyā ibn Zakariyyāʾ al-Katib al-Tabari (Tiberias), a Jewish theologian and Bible translator from Tiberias whose main claim to fame is the fact that Saadia Gaon studied with him at some point. He is not mentioned in any Jewish source, and apart from the Andalusian heresiographer and polemicist Ibn Hazm, who mentions him as a Jewish mutakallim (rational theologian), our main source of information is the Kitāb al-Tanbīh by the Muslim historian al-Masʿūdī (d. 956). In his brief survey of Arabic translations of the Bible, al-Masʿūdī states that the Israelites rely for exegesis and translation of the Hebrew books—i.e., the Torah, Prophets, and Psalms, twenty-four books in all, he says—on a number of Israelites whom they praise highly, almost all of whom he has met in person. He mentions Abū ʾl-Kathīr as one of them, and also Saadia ("Saʿīd ibn Yaʿqūb al-Fayyūmī").  Regardless of what we do not know, Saadia traveled to Tiberias (home of the learned scribes and exegetes) to learn and he chose Abū 'l-Kathīr Yaḥyā ibn Zakariyyāʾ al-Katib al-Tabariya. The extent of Abū ʾl-Kathīr's influence on Saadia's thought cannot be established, however.

Abū ʾl-Kathīr's profession is also unclear. al-Masʿūdī calls him a kātib, which has been variously interpreted as secretary, government official, (biblical) scribe, Masorete, and book copyist. For lack of further information, some scholars have tried to identify Abū ʾl-Kathīr with the Hebrew grammarian Abū ʿAlī Judah ben ʿAllān, likewise of Tiberias, who seems to have been a Karaite Jew. However, al-Masūdī unequivocally describes Abu ʾl-Kathīr (as well as his student Saadia) as an ashmaʿthī (Rabbanite).

In "Book of the Articles of Faith and Doctrines of Dogma" Saadia declares the rationality of the Jewish religion with the caveat that reason must capitulate wherever it contradicts tradition. Dogma takes precedence over reason. Saadia closely followed the rules of the Muʿtazila school of Abu Ali al-Jubba'i in composing his works.  It was Saadia who laid foundations for Jewish rationalist theology which built upon the work of the Muʿtazila, thereby shifting Rabbinic Judaism from mythical explanations of the rabbis to reasoned explanations of the intellect.  Saadia advanced the criticisms of Muʿtazila by Ibn al-Rawandi.

David ibn Merwan al-Mukkamas 

David ibn Merwan al-Mukkamas was author of the earliest known Jewish philosophical work of the Middle Ages, a commentary on the Sefer Yetzirah; he is regarded as the father of Jewish medieval philosophy. Sl-Mukkamas was first to introduce the methods of Kalam into Judaism and the first Jew to mention Aristotle in his writings.  He was a proselyte of Rabbinic Judaism (not Karaite Judaism, as some argue); al-Mukkamas was a student of physician, and renowned Christian philosopher, Hana.  His close interaction with Hana, and his familial affiliation with Islam gave al-Mukkamas a unique view of religious belief and theology.

In 1898 Abraham Harkavy discovered, in Imperial Library of St. Petersburg, fifteen of the twenty chapters of David's philosophical work entitled Ishrun Maḳalat (Twenty Chapters) of which 15 survive.  One of the oldest surviving witnesses to early Kalām, it begins with epistemological investigations, turns to proofs of the creation of the world and the subsequent existence of a Creator, discusses the unity of the Creator (including the divine attributes), and concludes with theodicy (humanity and revelation) and a refutation of other religions (mostly lost).

In 915 CE, Sa'adya Gaon left for Palestine, where, according to al-Masʿūdī (Tanbīh, 113), he perfected his education at the feet of Abū 'l-Kathīr Yaḥyā ibn Zakariyyāʾ al-Katib al-Tabari (d. 320/932). The latter is also mentioned by Ibn Ḥazm in his K. al-Fiṣlal wa 'l-niḥal, iii, 171, as being, together with Dāwūd ibn Marwān al-Muqammiṣ and Sa'adya himself, one of the mutakallimūn of the Jews.

Since al-Muqammiṣ made few references to specifically Jewish issues and very little of his work was translated from Arabic into Hebrew, he was largely forgotten by  Jewish tradition. Nonetheless, he had a significant impact on subsequent Jewish philosophical followers of the Kalām, such as Saʿadya Gaon.

Samuel ibn Naghrillah 
Samuel ibn Naghrillah, born in Mérida, Spain, lived in Córdoba and was a child prodigy and student of Hanoch ben Moshe. Samuel ibn Naghrillah, Hasdai ibn Shaprut, and Moshe ben Hanoch founded the Lucena Yeshiva that produced such brilliant scholars as Isaac ibn Ghiyyat and Maimon ben Yosef, the father of Maimonides. Ibn Naghrillah's son, Yosef, provided refuge for two sons of Hezekiah Gaon; Daud Ibn Chizkiya Gaon Ha-Nasi and Yitzhak Ibn Chizkiya Gaon Ha-Nasi.  Though not a philosopher, he did build the infrastructure to allow philosophers to thrive.  In 1070 the gaon Isaac ben Moses ibn Sakri of Denia, Spain traveled to the East and acted as rosh yeshivah of the Baghdad Academy.

Solomon ibn Gabirol 

Solomon ibn Gabirol was born in Málaga then moved to Valencia.  Ibn Gabirol was one of the first teachers of Neoplatonism in Europe. His role has been compared to that of Philo. Ibn Gabirol occidentalized Greco-Arabic philosophy and restored it to Europe.  The philosophical teachings of Philo and ibn Gabirol were largely ignored by fellow Jews; the parallel may be extended by adding that Philo and ibn Gabirol both exercised considerable influence in secular circles; Philo upon early Christianity and Ibn Gabirol upon the scholars of medieval Christianity. Christian scholars, including Albertus Magnus and  Thomas Aquinas, defer to him frequently.

Abraham bar-Hiyya Ha-Nasi 

Abraham bar Hiyya, of Barcelona and later Arles-Provence, was a student of his father Hiyya al-Daudi and one of the most important figures in the scientific movement which made the Jews of Provence, Spain and Italy the intermediaries between Averroism, Muʿtazila and Christian Europe. He aided this scientific movement by original works, translations and as interpreter for another translator, Plato Tiburtinus. Bar-Hiyya's best student was v.  His philosophical works are "Meditation of the Soul", an ethical work written from a rationalistic religious viewpoint, and an apologetic epistle addressed to Judah ben Barzillai.

Hibat Allah 
Originally known by his Hebrew name Nethanel Baruch ben Melech al-Balad, Abu'l-Barakāt al-Baghdādī, known as Hibat Allah, was a Jewish philosopher and physicist and father-in-law of Maimonides who converted to Islam in his twilight years - once head of the Baghdad Yeshiva and considered the leading philosopher of Iraq.

Historians differ over the motive for his conversion to Islam. Some suggest it was a reaction to a social slight inflicted upon him because he was a Jew, while others suggest he was forcibly converted at the edge of a sword (which prompted Maimonides to comment upon Anusim). Despite his conversion to Islam, his works continued to be studied at the Jewish Baghdad Academy, a well-known academy, into the thirteenth century. He was a follower of Avicenna's teaching, who proposed an explanation of the acceleration of falling bodies by the accumulation of successive increments of power with successive increments of velocity.

His writings include Kitāb al-Muʿtabar ("The Book of What Has Been Established by Personal Reflection"); a philosophical commentary on the Kohelet, written in Arabic using Hebrew aleph bet; and the treatise "On the Reason Why the Stars Are Visible at Night and Hidden in Daytime." According to Hibat Allah, Kitāb al-Muʿtabar consists in the main of critical remarks jotted down by him over the years while reading philosophical text, and published at the insistence of his friends, in the form of a philosophical work.

Nethan'el al-Fayyumi 

Natan'el al-Fayyumi of Yemen, was the twelfth-century author of Bustan al-Uqul ("Garden of Intellects"), a Jewish version of Ismaili Shi'i doctrines. Like the Ismailis, Natan'el al-Fayyumi argued that God sent different prophets to various nations of the world, containing legislations suited to the particular temperament of each individual nation.  Ismaili doctrine holds that a single universal religious truth lies at the root of the different religions. Some Jews accepted this model of religious pluralism, leading them to view Muhammad as a legitimate prophet, though not Jewish, sent to preach to the Arabs, just as the Hebrew prophets had been sent to deliver their messages to Israel; others refused this notion in entirety.

Bahya ben Joseph ibn Paquda 

Bahye ben Yosef Ibn Paquda, of Zaragoza, was author of the first Jewish system of ethics Al Hidayah ila Faraid al-hulub, ("Guide to the Duties of the Heart").  Bahya often followed the method of the Arabian encyclopedists known as "the Brethren of Purity" but adopts some of Sufi tenets rather than Ismaili.  According to Bahya, the Torah appeals to reason and knowledge as proofs of God's existence.  It is therefore a duty incumbent upon every one to make God an object of speculative reason and knowledge, in order to arrive at true faith.  Baḥya borrows from Sufism and Jewish Kalam integrating them into Neoplatonism.  Proof that Bahya borrowed from Sufism is underscored by the fact that the title of his eighth gate, Muḥasabat al-Nafs ("Self-Examination"), is reminiscent of the Sufi  Abu Abd Allah Ḥarith Ibn-Asad, who has been surnamed El Muḥasib ("the self-examiner"), because—say his biographers—"he was always immersed in introspection"

Yehuda Ha-Levi and the Kuzari 

Judah Halevi of Toledo, Spain defended Rabbinic Judaism against Islam, Christianity and Karaite Judaism. He was a student of Moses ibn Ezra whose education came from Isaac ibn Ghiyyat; trained as a Rationalist, he shed it in favor of Neoplatonism.  Like al-Ghazali, Judah Halevi attempted to liberate religion from the bondage of philosophical systems.  In particular, in a work written in Arabic Kitab al-Ḥujjah wal-Dalil fi Nuṣr al-Din al-Dhalil, translated by Judah ben Saul ibn Tibbon, by the title Kuzari he elaborates upon his views of Judaism relative to other religions of the time.

Abraham ibn Daud 
Abraham ibn Daud was a student of Rabbi Baruch ben Yitzhak Ibn Albalia, his maternal uncle.  Ibn Daud's philosophical work written in Arabic, Al-'akidah al-Rafiyah ("The Sublime Faith"), has been preserved in Hebrew by the title Emunah Ramah.  Ibn Daud did not introduce a new philosophy, but he was the first to introduce a more thorough systematic form derived from Aristotle.  Accordingly, Hasdai Crescas mentions Ibn Daud as the only Jewish philosopher among the predecessors of Maimonides.  Overshadowed by Maimonides, ibn Daud's Emunah Ramah, a work to which Maimonides was indebted, received little notice from later philosophers.  "True philosophy", according to Ibn Daud, "does not entice us from religion; it tends rather to strengthen and solidify it. Moreover, it is the duty of every thinking Jew to become acquainted with the harmony existing between the fundamental doctrines of Judaism and those of philosophy, and, wherever they seem to contradict one another, to seek a mode of reconciling them".

Other notable Jewish philosophers pre-Maimonides 
 Abraham ibn Ezra
 Isaac ibn Ghiyyat
 Moses ibn Ezra
 Yehuda Alharizi
 Joseph ibn Tzaddik
 Samuel ibn Tibbon

Maimonides 

Maimonides wrote The Guide for the Perplexed — his most influential philosophic work. He was a student of his father, Rabbi Maimon ben Yosef (a student of Joseph ibn Migash) in Cordoba, Spain.  When his family fled Spain, for Fez, Maimonides enrolled in the Academy of Fez and studied under Rabbi Yehuda Ha-Kohen Ibn Soussan — a student of Isaac Alfasi. Maimonides strove to reconcile Aristotelian philosophy and science with the teachings of Torah. In some ways his position was parallel to that of Averroes; in reaction to the attacks on Avicennian Aristotelism, Maimonides embraced and defended a stricter Aristotelism without Neoplatonic additions.  The principles which inspired all of Maimonides' philosophical activity was identical those of Abraham Ibn Daud: there can be no contradiction between the truths which God has revealed and the findings of the human intellect in science and philosophy. Maimonides departed from the teachings of Aristotle by suggesting that the world is not eternal, as Aristotle taught, but was created ex nihilo.  In "Guide for the Perplexed" (1:17 & 2:11)" Maimonides explains that Israel lost its Mesorah in exile, and with it "we lost our science and philosophy — only to be rejuvenated in Al Andalus within the context of interaction and intellectual investigation of Jewish, Christian and Muslim texts.

Medieval Jewish philosophy after Maimonides 
Maimonides writings almost immediately came under attack from Karaites, Dominican Christians, Tosafists of Provence, Ashkenaz and Al Andalus. Scholars suggest that Maimonides instigated the Maimonidean Controversy when he verbally attacked Samuel ben Ali ("Gaon of Baghdad") as "one whom people accustom from his youth to believe that there is none like him in his generation," and he sharply attacked the "monetary demands" of the academies. Samuel ben Ali was an anti-Maimonidean operating in Babylon to undermine the works of Maimonides and those of Maimonides' patrons (the Al-Constantini family from North Africa). To illustrate the reach of the Maimonidean Controversy, Samuel ben Ali, the chief opponent of Maimonides in the East, was excommunicated by Daud Ibn Hodaya al Daudi (Exilarch of Mosul). Maimonides' attacks on Samuel ben Ali may not have been entirely altruistic given the position of Maimonides' in-laws in competing Yeshivas.

In Western Europe, the controversy was halted by the burning of Maimonides' works by Christian Dominicans in 1232. Avraham son of Rambam, continued fighting for his father's beliefs in the East; desecration of Maimonides' tomb, at Tiberias by Jews, was a profound shock to Jews throughout the Diaspora and caused all to pause and reflect upon what was being done to the fabric of Jewish culture. This compelled many anti-Maimonideans to recant their assertions and realize what cooperation with Christians meant to them, their texts and their communities.

Maimonidean controversy flared up again at the beginning of the fourteenth century when Rabbi Shlomo ben Aderet, under influence from Asher ben Jehiel, issued a cherem on "any member of the community who, being under twenty-five years, shall study the works of the Greeks on natural science and metaphysics."

Contemporary Kabbalists, Tosafists and Rationalists continue to engage in lively, sometimes caustic, debate in support of their positions and influence in the Jewish world. At the center of many of these debates are "Guide for the Perplexed", "13 Principles of Faith", "Mishnah Torah", and his commentary on Anusim.

Yosef ben Yehuda of Ceuta 
Joseph ben Judah of Ceuta was the son of Rabbi Yehuda Ha-Kohen Ibn Soussan and a student of Maimonides for whom the Guide for the Perplexed is written. Yosef traveled from Alexandria to Fustat to study logic, mathematics, and astronomy under Maimonides. Philosophically, Yosef's dissertation, in Arabic, on the problem of "Creation" is suspected to have been written before contact with Maimonides. It is entitled Ma'amar bimehuyav ha-metsiut ve'eykhut sidur ha-devarim mimenu vehidush ha'olam ("A Treatise as to (1) Necessary Existence (2) The Procedure of Things from the Necessary Existence and (3) The Creation of the World").

Jacob Anatoli 
Jacob Anatoli is generally regarded as a pioneer in the application of the Maimonidean Rationalism to the study of Jewish texts. He was the son-in-law of Samuel ibn Tibbon, translator of Maimonides. Due to these family ties Anatoli was introduced to the philosophy of Maimonides, the study of which was such a great revelation to him that he, in later days, referred to it as the beginning of his intelligent and true comprehension of the Scriptures, while he frequently alluded to Ibn Tibbon as one of the two masters who had instructed and inspired him. Anatoli wrote the Malmad exhibiting his broad knowledge of classic Jewish exegetes, as well as Plato, Aristotle, Averroes, and the Vulgate, as well as with a large number of Christian institutions, some of which he ventures to criticize, such as celibacy and monastic castigation, as well as certain heretics and he repeatedly appeals to his readers for a broader cultivation of the classic languages and the non-Jewish branches of learning. To Anatoli all men are, in truth, formed in the image of God, although the Jews stand under a particular obligation to further the true cognition of God simply by reason of their election, "the Greeks had chosen wisdom as their pursuit; the Romans, power; and the Jews, religiousness"

Hillel ben Samuel 
Firstly, Hillel ben Samuel's importance in the history of medieval Jewish philosophy lies in his attempt to deal, systematically, with the question of the immortality of the soul. Secondly, Hillel played a major role in the controversies of 1289–90 concerning the philosophical works of Maimonides. Thirdly, Hillel was the first devotee of Jewish learning and Philosophy in Italy, bringing a close to a period of relative ignorance of Hakira in Verona (Italy). And finally, Hillel is one of the early Latin translators of "the wise men of the nations" (non-Jewish scholars).

Defending Maimonides, Hillel addressed a letter to his friend Maestro Gaio asking him to use his influence with the Jews of Rome against Maimonides' opponents (Solomon Petit). He also advanced the bold idea of gathering together Maimonides' defenders and opponents in Alexandria, in order to bring the controversy before a court of Babylonian rabbis, whose decision would be binding on both factions. Hillel was certain the verdict would favor Maimonides.

Hillel wrote a commentary on the 25 propositions appearing at the beginning of the second part of the Guide of the Perplexed, and three philosophical treatises, which were appended to Tagmulei ha-Nefesh: the first on knowledge and free will; the second on the question of why mortality resulted from the sin of Adam; the third on whether or not the belief in the fallen angels is a true belief.

Shemtob Ben Joseph Ibn Falaquera 

Shem-Tov ibn Falaquera was a Spanish-born philosopher who pursued reconciliation between Jewish dogma and philosophy.  Scholars speculate he was a student of Rabbi David Kimhi whose family fled Spain to Narbonne. Ibn Falaquera lived an ascetic live of solitude. Ibn Falaquera's two leading philosophic authorities were Averroes and Maimonides. Ibn Falaquera defended the "Guide for the Perplexed" against attacks of anti-Maimonideans. He knew the works of the Islamic philosophers better than any Jewish scholar of his time, and made many of them available to other Jewish scholars – often without attribution (Reshit Hokhmah). Ibn Falaquera did not hesitate to modify Islamic philosophic texts when it suited his purposes. For example, Ibn Falaquera turned Alfarabi's account of the origin of philosophic religion into a discussion of the origin of the "virtuous city". Ibn Falaquera's other works include, but are not limited to Iggeret Hanhagat ha-Guf we ha-Nefesh, a treatise in verse on the control of the body and the soul.

 Iggeret ha-Wikkuaḥ, a dialogue between a religious Jew and a Jewish philosopher on the harmony of philosophy and religion.
 Reshit Ḥokmah, treating of moral duties, of the sciences, and of the necessity of studying philosophy.
 Sefer ha-Ma'alot, on different degrees of human perfection.
 Moreh ha-Moreh, commentary on the philosophical part of Maimonides' "Guide for the Perplexed".

Joseph ben Abba Mari ibn Kaspi 
Ibn Kaspi was a fierce advocate of Maimonides to such an extent that he left for Egypt in 1314 in order to hear explanations on the latter's Guide of the Perplexed from Maimonides' grandchildren. When he heard that the Guide of the Perplexed was being studied in the Muslim philosophical schools of Fez, he left for that town (in 1332) in order to observe their method of study.

Ibn Kaspi began writing when he was 17 years old on topics which included logic, linguistics, ethics, theology, biblical exegesis, and super-commentaries to Abraham Ibn Ezra and Maimonides. Philosophic systems he followed were Aristotle's and Averroes'. He defines his aim as "not to be a fool who believes in everything, but only in that which can be verified by proof...and not to be of the second unthinking category which disbelieves from the start of its inquiry," since "certain things must be accepted by tradition, because they cannot be proven." Scholars continue to debate whether ibn Kaspi was a heretic or one of Judaisms most illustrious scholars.

Gersonides 

Rabbi Levi ben Gershon was a student of his father Gerson ben Solomon of Arles, who in turn was a student of Shem-Tov ibn Falaquera.  Gersonides is best known for his work Milhamot HaShem ("Wars of the Lord").  Milhamot HaShem is modelled after the "Guide for the Perplexed".  Gersonides and his father were avid students of the works of Alexander of Aphrodisias, Aristotle, Empedocles, Galen, Hippocrates, Homer, Plato, Ptolemy, Pythagoras, Themistius, Theophrastus, Ali ibn Abbas al-Magusi, Ali ibn Ridwan, Averroes, Avicenna, Qusta ibn Luqa, Al-Farabi, Al-Fergani, Chonain, Isaac Israeli, Ibn Tufail, Ibn Zuhr, Isaac Alfasi, and Maimonides. Gersonides held that God does not have complete foreknowledge of human acts. "Gersonides, bothered by the old question of how God's foreknowledge is compatible with human freedom, suggests that what God knows beforehand is all the choices open to each individual. God does not know, however, which choice the individual, in his freedom, will make."

Moses Narboni 
Moses ben Joshua composed commentaries on Islamic philosophical works. As an admirer of Averroes, he devoted a great deal of study to his works and wrote commentaries on a number of them. His best-known work is his Shelemut ha-Nefesh ("Treatise on the Perfection of the Soul"). Moses began studying philosophy with his father when he was thirteen later studying with Moses ben David Caslari and Abraham ben David Caslari - both of whom were students of Kalonymus ben Kalonymus. Moses believed that Judaism was a guide to the highest degree of theoretical and moral truth. He believed that the Torah had both a simple, direct meaning accessible to the average reader as well as a deeper, metaphysical meaning accessible to thinkers. Moses rejected the belief in miracles, instead believing they could be explained, and defended man's free will by philosophical arguments.

Isaac ben Sheshet Perfet 

Isaac ben Sheshet Perfet, of Barcelona, studied under Hasdai Crescas and Rabbi Nissim ben Reuben Gerondi.  Nissim ben Reuben Gerondi was a steadfast Rationalist who did not hesitate to refute leading authorities, such as Rashi, Rabbeinu Tam, Moses ben Nahman, and Solomon ben Adret.  The pogroms of 1391, against Jews of Spain, forced Isaac to flee to Algiers - where he lived out his life. Isaac's responsa evidence a profound knowledge of the philosophical writings of his time; in one of Responsa No. 118 he explains the difference between the opinion of Gersonides and that of Abraham ben David of Posquières on free will, and gives his own views on the subject. He was an adversary of Kabbalah who never spoke of the Sefirot; he quotes another philosopher when reproaching kabbalists with "believing in the "Ten" (Sefirot) as the Christians believe in the Trinity".

Hasdai ben Abraham Crescas 

Hasdai Crescas, of Barcelona, was a leading rationalist on issues of natural law and free-will. His views  can be seen as precursors to Baruch Spinoza's. His work, Or Adonai, became a classic refutation of medieval Aristotelianism, and harbinger of the scientific revolution in the 16th century. Hasdai Crescas was a student of Nissim ben Reuben Gerondi, who in turn was a student of Reuben ben Nissim Gerondi. Crescas was a rabbi and the head of the Jewish community of Aragon, and in some ways of all Hispanic Jewry, during one of its most critical periods. Among his fellow students and friends, his best friend was Isaac ben Sheshet Perfet.  Crescas' students won accolades as participants in the Disputation of Tortosa.

Simeon ben Zemah Duran 
Influenced by the teaching of Rabbi Nissim of Gerona, via Ephraim Vidal's Yeshiva in Majorca, Duran's commentary Magen Avot ("The Shield of the Fathers"), which influenced Joseph Albo, is important.  He was also a student of philosophy, astronomy, mathematics, and especially of medicine, which he practiced for a number of years at Palma, in Majorca. Magen Avot deals with concepts such as the nature of God, the eternity of the Torah, the coming of the Messiah, and the Resurrection of the dead. Duran believed that Judaism has three dogmas only: the existence of God, the Torah's Divine origin, and Reward and Punishment; in this regard he was followed by Joseph Albo.

Joseph Albo 
Joseph Albo, of Monreal, was a student of Hasdai Crescas.  He wrote Sefer ha-Ikkarim ("Book of Principles"), a classic work on the fundamentals of Judaism.  Albo narrows the fundamental Jewish principles of faith from thirteen to three -
 belief in the existence of God,
 belief in revelation, and
 belief in divine justice, as related to the idea of immortality.
Albo rejects the assumption that creation ex nihilo is essential in belief in God. Albo freely criticizes Maimonides' thirteen principles of belief and Crescas' six principles. According to Albo, "belief in the Messiah is only a 'twig' unnecessary to the soundness of the trunk"; not essential to Judaism. Nor is it true, according to Albo, that every law is binding. Although every ordinance has the power of conferring happiness in its observance, it is not true that every law must be observed, or that through the neglect of a part of the law, a Jew would violate the divine covenant or be damned. Contemporary Orthodox Jews, however, vehemently disagree with Albo's position believing that all Jews are divinely obligated to fulfill every applicable commandment.

Hoter ben Solomon 

Hoter ben Shlomo was a scholar and philosopher in Yemen heavily influenced by Nethanel ben al-Fayyumi, Maimonides, Saadia Gaon and al-Ghazali. The connection between the "Epistle of the Brethren of Purity" and Ismailism suggests the adoption of this work as one of the main sources of what would become known as "Jewish Ismailism" as found in Late Medieval Yemenite Judaism. "Jewish Ismailism" consisted of adapting, to Judaism, a few Ismaili doctrines about cosmology, prophecy, and hermeneutics. There are many examples of the Brethren of Purity influencing Yemenite Jewish philosophers and authors in the period 1150–1550. Some traces of Brethren of Purity doctrines, as well as of their numerology, are found in two Yemenite philosophical midrashim written in 1420–1430: Midrash ha-hefez ("The Glad Learning") by Zerahyah ha-Rofé (a/k/a Yahya al-Tabib) and the Siraj al-'uqul ("Lamp of Intellects") by Hoter ben Solomon.

Don Isaac Abravanel 

Isaac Abravanel, statesman, philosopher, Bible commentator, and financier who commented on Maimonides' thirteen principles in his Rosh Amanah. Isaac Abravanel was steeped in Rationalism by the Ibn Yahya family, who had a residence immediately adjacent to the Great Synagogue of Lisbon (also built by the Ibn Yahya Family). His most important work, Rosh Amanah ("The Pinnacle of Faith"), defends Maimonides' thirteen articles of belief against attacks of Hasdai Crescas and Yosef Albo. Rosh Amanah ends with the statement that "Maimonides compiled these articles merely in accordance with the fashion of other nations, which set up axioms or fundamental principles for their science".

Isaac Abravanel was born and raised in Lisbon; a student of the Rabbi of Lisbon, Yosef ben Shlomo Ibn Yahya.  Rabbi Yosef was a poet, religious scholar, rebuilder of Ibn Yahya Synagogue of Calatayud, well versed in rabbinic literature and in the learning of his time, devoting his early years to the study of Jewish philosophy.  The Ibn Yahya family were renowned physicians, philosophers and accomplished aides to the Portuguese Monarchy for centuries.

Isaac's grandfather, Samuel Abravanel, was forcibly converted to Christianity during the pogroms of 1391 and took the Spanish name "Juan Sanchez de Sevilla". Samuel fled Castile-León, Spain, in 1397 for Lisbon, Portugal, and reverted to Judaism - shedding his Converso after living among Christians for six years. Conversions outside Judaism, coerced or otherwise, had a strong impact upon young Isaac, later compelling him to forfeit his immense wealth in an attempt to redeem Iberian Jewry from coercion of the Alhambra Decree. There are parallels between what he writes, and documents produced by Inquisitors, that present conversos as ambivalent to Christianity and sometimes even ironic in their expressions regarding their new religion - crypto-jews.

Leone Ebreo 
Judah Leon Abravanel was a Portuguese physician, poet and philosopher. His work Dialoghi d'amore ("Dialogues of Love"), written in Italian, was one of the most important philosophical works of his time. In an attempt to circumvent a plot, hatched by local Catholic Bishops to kidnap his son, Judah sent his son from Castile, to Portugal with a nurse, but by order of the king, the son was seized and baptized. This was a devastating insult to Judah and his family, and was a source of bitterness throughout Judah's life and the topic of his writings years later; especially since this was not the first time the Abravanel Family was subjected to such embarrassment at the hands of the Catholic Church.

Judah's Dialoghi is regarded as the finest of Humanistic Period works. His neoplatonism is derived from the Hispanic Jewish community, especially the works of Ibn Gabirol. Platonic notions of reaching towards a nearly impossible ideal of beauty, wisdom, and perfection encompass the whole of his work. In Dialoghi d'amore, Judah defines love in philosophical terms. He structures his three dialogues as a conversation between two abstract "characters": Philo, representing love or appetite, and Sophia, representing science or wisdom, Philo+Sophia (philosophia).

Criticisms of Kabbalah 
The word "Kabbalah" was used in medieval Jewish texts to mean "tradition", see Abraham Ibn Daud's Sefer Ha-Qabbalah also known as the "Book of our Tradition". "Book of our Tradition" does not refer to mysticism of any kind - it chronicles "our tradition of scholarship and study" in two Babylonian Academies, through the Geonim, into Talmudic Yeshivas of Spain. In Talmudic times there was a mystic tradition in Judaism, known as Maaseh Bereshith (the work of creation) and Maaseh Merkavah (the work of the chariot); Maimonides interprets these texts as referring to Aristotelian physics and metaphysics as interpreted in the light of Torah.

In the 13th century, however, a mystical-esoteric system emerged which became known as "the Kabbalah".  Many of the beliefs associated with Kabbalah had long been rejected by philosophers. Saadia Gaon had taught in his book Emunot v'Deot that Jews who believe in gilgul have adopted a non-Jewish belief. Maimonides rejected many texts of Heichalot, particularly Shi'ur Qomah whose anthropomorphic vision of God he considered heretical.

In the 13th century, Meir ben Simon of Narbonne wrote an epistle (included in Milhhemet Mitzvah) against early Kabbalists, singled out Sefer Bahir, rejecting the attribution of its authorship to the tanna R. Nehhunya ben ha-Kanah and describing some of its content:

Other notable Jewish philosophers post-Maimonides 
 Jedaiah ben Abraham Bedersi
 Nissim of Gerona
 Jacob ben Machir ibn Tibbon
 Isaac Nathan ben Kalonymus
 Judah Messer Leon
 David ben Judah Messer Leon
 Obadiah ben Jacob Sforno
 Judah Moscato
 Azariah dei Rossi
 Isaac Aboab I
 Isaac Campanton a.k.a. "the gaon of Castile"
 Isaac ben Moses Arama
 Profiat Duran a Converso, Duran wrote Be Not Like Your Fathers

Renaissance Jewish philosophy and philosophers 

Some of the Monarchies of Asia Minor and European welcomed expelled Jewish Merchants, scholars and theologians.  Divergent Jewish philosophies evolved against the backdrop of new cultures, new languages and renewed theological exchange. Philosophic  exploration continued through the Renaissance period as the center-of-mass of Jewish Scholarship shifted to France, Germany, Italy, and Turkey.

Elias ben Moise del Medigo 
Elia del Medigo was a descendant of Judah ben Eliezer ha-Levi Minz and Moses ben Isaac ha-Levi Minz.  Eli'ezer del Medigo, of Rome, received the surname "Del Medigo" after studying medicine.  The name was later changed from Del Medigo to Ha-rofeh. He was the father and teacher of a long line of rationalist philosophers and scholars.  Non-Jewish students of Delmedigo classified him as an "Averroist", however, he saw himself as a follower of Maimonides. Scholastic association of Maimonides and Ibn Rushd would have been a natural one; Maimonides, towards the end of his life, was impressed with the Ibn Rushd commentaries and recommended them to his students. The followers of Maimonides (Maimonideans) had therefore been, for several generations before Delmedigo, the leading users, translators and disseminators of the works of Ibn Rushd in Jewish circles, and advocates for Ibn Rushd even after Islamic rejection of his radical views. Maimonideans regarded Maimonides and Ibn Rushd as following the same general line.  In his book, Delmedigo portrays himself as defender of Maimonidean Judaism, and — like many Maimonideans — he emphasized the rationality of Jewish tradition.

Moses Almosnino 
Moses Almosnino was born Thessaloniki 1515 - died Constantinople abt 1580. He was a student of Levi Ibn Habib, who was in turn a student of Jacob ibn Habib, who was, in turn, a student of Nissim ben Reuben. In 1570 he wrote a commentary on the Pentateuch titled "Yede Mosheh" (The Hands of Moses); also an exposition of the Talmudical treatise "Abot" (Ethics of the Fathers), published in Salonica in 1563; and a collection of sermons delivered upon various occasions, particularly funeral orations, entitled "Meammeẓ Koaḥ" (Re-enforcing Strength).

al-Ghazâlî's Intentions of the Philosophers (De'ôt ha-Fîlôsôfîm or Kavvanôt ha-Fîlôsôfîm) was one of the most widespread philosophical texts studied among Jews in Europe having been translated in 1292 by Isaac Albalag.  Later Hebrew commentators include Moses Narboni, and Moses Almosnino.

Moses ben Jehiel Ha-Kohen Porto-Rafa (Rapaport) 
Moses ben Jehiel Ha-Kohen Porto-Rafa (Rapaport), was a member of the German family "Rafa" (from whom the Delmedigo family originates) that settled in the town of Porto in the vicinity of Verona, Italy, and became the progenitors of the renowned Rapaport rabbinic family. In 1602 Moses served as rabbi of Badia Polesine in Piedmont. Moses was a friend of Leon Modena.

Abraham ben Judah ha-Levi Minz 
Abraham ben Judah ha-Levi Minz was an Italian rabbi who flourished at Padua in the first half of the 16th century, father-in-law of Meïr Katzenellenbogen. Minz studied chiefly under his father, Judah Minz, whom he succeeded as rabbi and head of the yeshiva of Padua.

Meir ben Isaac Katzellenbogen 

Meir ben Isaac Katzellenbogen was born in Prague where together with Shalom Shachna he studied under Jacob Pollak. Many rabbis, including Moses Isserles, addressed him in their responsa as the "av bet din of the republic of Venice." The great scholars of the Renaissance with whom he corresponded include Shmuel ben Moshe di Modena, Joseph Katz, Solomon Luria, Moses Isserles, Obadiah Sforno, and Moses Alashkar.

Elijah Ba'al Shem of Chelm 
Rabbi Elijah Ba'al Shem of Chelm was a student of Rabbi Solomon Luria who was, in turn a student of Rabbi Shalom Shachna - father-in-law and teacher of Moses Isserles. Elijah Ba'al Shem of Chelm was also a cousin of Moses Isserles.

Eliezer ben Elijah Ashkenazi 
Rabbi Eliezer ben Elijah Ashkenazi Ha-rofeh Ashkenazi of Nicosia ("the physician")  the author of Yosif Lekah on the Book of Esther.

Other notable Renaissance Jewish philosophers 
 Francisco Sanches
 Miguel de Barrios
 Uriel da Costa

Seventeenth-century Jewish philosophy 

With expulsion from Spain came the dissemination of Jewish philosophical investigation throughout the Mediterranean Basin, Northern Europe and the Western Hemisphere. The center-of-mass of Rationalism shifted to France, Italy, Germany, Crete, Sicily and Netherlands.  Expulsion from Spain and the coordinated pogroms of Europe resulted in the cross-pollination of variations on Rationalism incubated within diverse communities.  This period is also marked by the intellectual exchange among leaders of the Christian Reformation and Jewish scholars.  Of particular note is the line of Rationalists who migrated out of Germany, and present-day Italy into Crete, and other areas of the Ottoman Empire seeking safety and protection from the endless pogroms fomented by the House of Habsburg and the Roman Catholic Church against Jews.

Rationalism was incubating in places far from Spain. From stories told by Rabbi Elijah Ba'al Shem of Chelm, German-speaking Jews, descendants of Jews who migrated back to Jerusalem after Charlemagne's invitation was revoked in Germany many centuries earlier, who lived in Jerusalem during the 11th century, were influenced by prevailing Mutazilite scholars of Jerusalem. A German-speaking Palestinian Jew saved the life of a young German man surnamed "Dolberger". When the knights of the First Crusade came to besiege Jerusalem, one of Dolberger's family members rescued German-speaking Jews in Palestine and brought them back to the safety of Worms, Germany, to repay the favor. Further evidence of German communities in the holy city comes in the form of halakic questions sent from Germany to Jerusalem during the second half of the eleventh century.

All of the foregoing resulted in an explosion of new ideas and philosophic paths.

Yosef Shlomo ben Eliyahu Dal Medigo 
Joseph Solomon Delmedigo was  a physician and teacher – Baruch Spinoza was a student of his works.

Baruch Spinoza 

Baruch Spinoza founded Spinozism, broke with Rabbinic Jewish tradition, and was placed in herem by the Beit Din of Amsterdam. The influence in his work from Maimonides and Leone Ebreo is evident. Elia del Medigo claims to be a student of the works of Spinoza. Some contemporary critics (e.g., Wachter, Der Spinozismus im Judenthum) claimed to detect the influence of the Kabbalah, while others (e.g., Leibniz) regarded Spinozism as a revival of Averroism – a talmudist manner of referencing to Maimonidean Rationalism. In the centuries that have lapsed since the herem declaration, scholars have re-examined the works of Spinoza and find them to reflect a body of work and thinking that is not unlike some contemporary streams of Judaism. For instance, while Spinoza was accused of pantheism, scholars have come to view his work as advocating panentheism, a valid contemporary view easily accommodated by contemporary Judaism.

Tzvi Hirsch ben Yaakov Ashkenazi 
Rabbi Tzvi Hirsch ben Yaakov Ashkenazi was a student of his father, but most notably also a student of his grandfather Rabbi Elijah Ba'al Shem of Chelm.

Jacob Emden 
Rabbi Jacob Emden was a student of his father Rabbi Tzvi Hirsch ben Yaakov Ashkenazi a rabbi in Amsterdam. Emden, a steadfast Talmudist, was a prominent opponent of the Sabbateans (Messianic Kabbalists who followed Sabbatai Tzvi). Although anti-Maimonidean, Emden should be noted for his critical examination of the Zohar concluding that large parts of it were forged.

Other seventeenth-century Jewish philosophers 
 Jacob Abendana Sephardic Rabbi and Philosopher
 Isaac Cardoso
 David Nieto Sephardic Rabbi and Philosopher
 Isaac Orobio de Castro Sephardic Rabbi and Philosopher

Philosophical criticisms of Kabbalah 

Rabbi Leone di Modena wrote that if we were to accept the Kabbalah, then the Christian trinity would indeed be compatible with Judaism, as the Trinity closely resembles the Kabbalistic doctrine of the Sefirot.

Eighteenth and nineteenth-century Jewish philosophy 

A new era began in the 18th century with the thought of Moses Mendelssohn. Mendelssohn has been described as the "'third Moses,' with whom begins a new era in Judaism," just as new eras began with Moses the prophet and with Moses Maimonides.  Mendelssohn was a German Jewish philosopher to whose ideas the renaissance of European Jews, Haskalah (the Jewish Enlightenment) is indebted. He has been referred to as the father of Reform Judaism, although Reform spokesmen have been "resistant to claim him as their spiritual father". Mendelssohn came to be regarded as a leading cultural figure of his time by both Germans and Jews. His most significant book was Jerusalem oder über religiöse Macht und Judentum (Jerusalem), first published in 1783.

Alongside Mendelssohn, other important Jewish philosophers of the eighteenth century included:
 Menachem Mendel Lefin, anti-Hasidic Haskalah philosopher
 Salomon Maimon, Enlightenment philosopher
 Isaac Satanow, a Haskalah philosopher
 Naphtali Ullman, Haskalah philosopher

Important Jewish philosophers of the nineteenth century included:
 Elijah Benamozegh, a Sephardic rabbi and philosopher
 Hermann Cohen, a neo-Kantian Jewish philosopher
 Moses Hess, a secular Jewish philosopher and one of the founders of socialism
 Samson Raphael Hirsch, leader of the Torah im Derech Eretz school of 19th century neo-Orthodoxy
 Samuel Hirsch, a leader of Reform Judaism
 Nachman Krochmal, Haskalah philosopher in Galicia
 Samuel David Luzzatto a Sephardic rabbi and philosopher
 Karl Marx, German economist and Jewish philosopher.

Traditionalist attitudes towards philosophy 

Haredi traditionalists who emerged in reaction to the Haskalah considered the fusion of religion and philosophy as difficult because classical philosophers start with no preconditions for which conclusions they must reach in their investigation, while classical religious believers have a set of religious principles of faith that they hold one must believe. Most Haredim contended that one cannot simultaneously be a philosopher and a true adherent of a revealed religion. In this view, all attempts at synthesis ultimately fail. Rabbi Nachman of Breslov, for example, viewed all philosophy as untrue and heretical.  In this he represents one strand of Hasidic thought, with creative emphasis on the emotions.

Other exponents of Hasidism had a more positive attitude towards philosophy. In the Chabad writings of Schneur Zalman of Liadi, Hasidut is seen as able to unite all parts of Torah thought, from the schools of philosophy to mysticism, by uncovering the illuminating Divine essence that permeates and transcends all approaches. Interpreting the verse from Job, "from my flesh I see HaShem", Shneur Zalman explained the inner meaning, or "soul", of the Jewish mystical tradition in intellectual form, by means of analogies drawn from the human realm. As explained and continued by the later leaders of Chabad, this enabled the human mind to grasp concepts of Godliness, and so enable the heart to feel the love and awe of God, emphasised by all the founders of hasidism, in an internal way. This development, the culminating level of the Jewish mystical tradition, in this way bridges philosophy and mysticism, by expressing the transcendent in human terms.

20th and 21st-century Jewish philosophy

Jewish existentialism 

One of the major trends in modern Jewish philosophy was the attempt to develop a theory of Judaism through existentialism. Among the early Jewish existentialist philosophers was Lev Shestov (Jehuda Leib Schwarzmann), a Russian-Jewish philosopher. One of the most influential Jewish existentialists in the first half of the 20th century was Franz Rosenzweig. While researching his doctoral dissertation on the 19th-century German philosopher Georg Wilhelm Friedrich Hegel, Rosenzweig reacted against Hegel's idealism and developed an existential approach.  Rosenzweig, for a time, considered conversion to Christianity, but in 1913, he turned to Jewish philosophy. He became a philosopher and student of Hermann Cohen. Rosenzweig's major work, Star of Redemption, is his new philosophy in which he portrays the relationships between haShem, humanity and world as they are connected by creation, revelation and redemption. Orthodox rabbi Joseph Soloveitchik, and Conservative rabbis Neil Gillman and Elliot N. Dorff have also been described as existentialists.

The French philosopher and Talmudic commentator Emmanuel Levinas, whose approach grew out of the phenomenological tradition in philosophy, has also been described as a Jewish existentialist.

Jewish rationalism 

Rationalism has re-emerged as a popular perspective among Jews.  Contemporary Jewish rationalism often draws on ideas associated with medieval philosophers such as Maimonides and modern Jewish rationalists such as Hermann Cohen.

Cohen was a German Jewish neo-Kantian philosopher who turned to Jewish subjects at the end of his career in the early 20th century, picking up on ideas of Maimonides. In America, Steven Schwarzschild continued Cohen's legacy. Another prominent contemporary Jewish rationalist is Lenn Goodman, who works out of the traditions of medieval Jewish rationalist philosophy.  Conservative rabbis Alan Mittleman of the Jewish Theological Seminary and Elliot N. Dorff of American Jewish University also see themselves in the rationalist tradition, as does David Novak of the University of Toronto.  Novak works in the natural law tradition, which is one version of rationalism.

Philosophers in modern-day Israel in the rationalist tradition include David Hartman and Moshe Halbertal.

Some Orthodox rationalists in Israel take a "restorationist" approach, reaching back in time for tools to simplify Rabbinic Judaism and bring all Jews, regardless of status or stream of Judaism, closer to observance of Halacha, Mitzvot, Kashrut and embrace of Maimonides' "13 Principles of Faith".  Dor Daim, and Rambamists are two groups who reject mysticism as a "superstitious innovation" to an otherwise clear and succinct set of Laws and rules. According to these rationalists, there is shame and disgrace attached to failure to investigate matters of religious principle using the fullest powers of human reason and intellect.  One cannot be considered wise, or perceptive, if one does not attempt to understand the origins, and establish the correctness, of one's beliefs.

Holocaust theology 

Judaism has traditionally taught that God is omnipotent, omniscient and omnibenevolent. Yet, these claims are in jarring contrast with the fact that there is much evil in the world. Perhaps the most difficult question that monotheists have confronted is "how can one reconcile the existence of this view of God with the existence of evil?" or "how can there be good without bad?"  "how can there be a God without a devil?" This is the problem of evil.  Within all monotheistic faiths many answers (theodicies) have been proposed.  However, in light of the magnitude of evil seen in the Holocaust, many people have re-examined classical views on this subject. How can people still have any kind of faith after the Holocaust?  This set of Jewish philosophies is discussed in the article on Holocaust theology.

Reconstructionist theology 

Perhaps the most controversial form of Jewish philosophy that developed in the early 20th century was the religious naturalism of Rabbi Mordecai Kaplan.  His theology was a variant of John Dewey's pragmatist philosophy.  Dewey's naturalism combined atheist beliefs with religious terminology in order to construct a philosophy for those who had lost faith in traditional Judaism.  In agreement with the classical medieval Jewish thinkers, Kaplan affirmed that haShem is not personal, and that all anthropomorphic descriptions of haShem are, at best, imperfect metaphors.  Kaplan's theology went beyond this to claim that haShem is the sum of all natural processes that allow man to become self-fulfilled.  Kaplan wrote that "to believe in haShem means to take for granted that it is man's destiny to rise above the brute and to eliminate all forms of violence and exploitation from human society."

Process theology 
A recent trend has been to reframe Jewish theology through the lens of process philosophy, more specifically process theology. Process philosophy suggests that fundamental elements of the universe are occasions of experience.  According to this notion, what people commonly think of as concrete objects are actually successions of these occasions of experience. Occasions of experience can be collected into groupings; something complex such as a human being is thus a grouping of many smaller occasions of experience. In this view, everything in the universe is characterized by experience (not to be confused with consciousness); there is no mind-body duality under this system, because "mind" is simply seen as a very developed kind of experiencing entity.

Intrinsic to this worldview is the notion that all experiences are influenced by prior experiences, and will influence all future experiences.  This process of influencing is never deterministic; an occasion of experience consists of a process of comprehending other experiences, and then reacting to it.  This is the "process" in "process philosophy". Process philosophy gives God a special place in the universe of occasions of experience. God encompasses all the other occasions of experience but also transcends them; thus process philosophy is a form of panentheism.

The original ideas of process theology were developed by Charles Hartshorne (1897–2000), and influenced a number of Jewish theologians, including British philosopher Samuel Alexander (1859–1938), and Rabbis Max Kadushin, Milton Steinberg and Levi A. Olan, Harry Slominsky, and Bradley Shavit Artson.  Abraham Joshua Heschel has also been linked to this tradition.

Kabbalah and philosophy 
Kabbalah continued to be central to Haredi Orthodox Judaism, which generally rejected philosophy, although the Chabad strain of Chasidism showed a more positive attitude towards philosophy. Meanwhile, non-Orthodox Jewish thought in the latter 20th century saw resurgent interest in Kabbalah. In academic studies, Gershom Scholem began the critical investigation of Jewish mysticism, while in non-Orthodox Jewish denominations, Jewish Renewal and Neo-Hasidism, spiritualised worship. Many philosophers do not consider this a form of philosophy, as Kabbalah is a collection of esoteric methods of textual interpretation. Mysticism is generally understood as an alternative to philosophy, not a variant of philosophy.

Among the modern critics of Kabbalah was Yihhyah Qafahh, who wrote a book entitled Milhamoth ha-Shem, (Wars of the Name) against what he perceived as the false teachings of the Zohar and the false Kabbalah of Isaac Luria. He is credited with spearheading the Dor Daim. Yeshayahu Leibowitz publicly shared the views expressed in Rabbi Yihhyah Qafahh's book Milhhamoth ha-Shem and elaborated upon these views in his many writings.

Contemporary Jewish philosophy

Philosophers who are associated with Orthodox Judaism 

 Eliezer Berkovits
 Monsieur Chouchani
 Eliyahu Dessler
 Israel Eldad
 Elimelech of Lizhensk
 David Hartman
 Samson Raphael Hirsch
 Abraham Isaac Kook
 Yeshayahu Leibowitz
 Menachem Mendel of Kotzk
 Nachman of Breslov
 Franz Rosenzweig
 Tamar Ross
 Daniel Rynhold
 Yehoshua Zimmerman
 Menachem Mendel Schneerson
 Joseph Soloveitchik
 Michael Wyschogrod
 Chaim Volozhin
 Shneur Zalman of Liadi

Philosophers who are associated with Conservative Judaism 

 Bradley Shavit Artson
 Elliot N. Dorff
 Neil Gillman
 Abraham Joshua Heschel
 William E. Kaufman
 Max Kadushin
 Alan Mittleman
 David Novak
 Ira F. Stone

Philosophers who are associated with Reform and Progressive Judaism 

 Rachel Adler (American rabbi, author and Feminist philosopher)
 Leo Baeck (leader in German Liberal Judaism)
 Eugene Borowitz (leader in American Reform Judaism)
 Emil Fackenheim (German-Canadian-Israeli philosopher)
 Avigdor Chaim Gold (German-Israeli philosopher)

Jewish philosophers whose philosophy is not necessarily focused on Jewish themes 
In the twentieth and twenty-first centuries there have also been many philosophers who are Jewish or of Jewish descent, and whose Jewish background might influence their approach to some degree, but whose writing is not necessarily focused on issues specific to Judaism.  These include:
 Theodor W. Adorno
 Joseph Agassi, an Israeli philosopher of science who developed Karl Popper's ideas
 Hannah Arendt
 Raymond Aron
 Zygmunt Bauman
 Walter Benjamin
 Henri Bergson
 Isaiah Berlin
 Ernst Bloch
 Allan Bloom
 Harold Bloom
 Susan Bordo
 Judith Butler
 Noam Chomsky, an American linguist, philosopher, cognitive scientist, and political activist
 Hélène Cixous
 Arthur Danto
 Jacques Derrida
 Hubert Dreyfus
 Ronald Dworkin, an American philosopher of law
 Yehuda Elkana, an Israeli philosopher of science
 Bracha L. Ettinger
 Viktor Frankl
 Sigmund Freud
 Erich Fromm
 Tamar Gendler
 Emma Goldman
 Lewis Gordon
 Jack Halberstam
 Ágnes Heller
 Max Horkheimer
 Edmund Husserl
 Alberto Jori, an Italian-Jewish philosopher
 Hans Jonas
 Melanie Klein
 Sarah Kofman
 Siegfried Kracauer
 Saul Kripke, a metaphysician and modal logician
 Franz Leopold Neumann
 Emmanuel Levinas
 Claude Lévi-Strauss
 Bernard-Henri Lévy
 Benny Lévy
 Leo Löwenthal
 Rosa Luxemburg
 György Lukács
 Herbert Marcuse
 Karl Marx
 Thomas Nagel, a Serbia-born Jewish philosopher
 Martha Nussbaum, an American moral and political philosopher
 Adi Ophir, an Israeli philosopher of science and moral philosopher
 Friedrich Pollock
 Karl Popper
 Moishe Postone
 Hilary Putnam, an American analytic philosopher
 Ayn Rand, a Russian-American Jewish philosopher who focused upon Aristotle's reason
 Avital Ronell
 Murray Rothbard
 Michael J. Sandel
 Eve Kosofsky Sedgwick, an American Queer theorist
 Lev Shestov
 Judith N. Shklar
 Peter Singer, a utilitarian philosopher
 Alan Soble, writes in philosophy of sex, American-born, Romanian-Russian ethnicity
 Susan Sontag
 Sandy Stone theorist, artist and a founder of transgender studies
 Leo Strauss
 Alfred Tarski - Polish logician
 Michael Walzer
 Immanuel Wallerstein
 Ludwig Wittgenstein
 Irvin D. Yalom

See also 

 Hasidic philosophy
 Jewish culture
 Jewish denominations
 Jewish ethics
 Jewish existentialism
 Jewish feminism
 Jewish folklore
 Jewish history
 Jewish literature
 Jewish mysticism
 Jewish mythology
 Jewish principles of faith
 Jewish religious movements
 Jewish thought
 Judaism and politics
 Microcosm-macrocosm analogy in Jewish philosophy

References

Further reading 
Online
  Material by topic, daat.ac.il
  Primary Sources, Ben Gurion University 
  Online materials, Halacha Brura Institute
  From the Israeli high-school syllabus, education.gov.il
  Articles on Jewish Philosophy-Haim Lifshitz and Isaac Lifshitz
  Free will in Jewish Philosophy
   
Print Sources
 Daniel H. Frank and Oliver Leaman (eds.), History of Jewish Philosophy.  London: Routledge, 1997. 
 Colette Sirat, A History of Jewish Philosophy in the Middle Ages. Cambridge University Press, 1990.

External links 
 Adventures in Philosophy - Jewish Philosophy Index (radicalacademy.com)
 Jewish Philosophy, The Dictionary of Philosophy (Dagobert D. Runes)
 Rabbi Haim Lifshitz-articles review Jewish Philosophy
 Rabbi Marc Angel's Project reflecting a fusion of Modern Orthodoxy and Sephardic Judaism
 Jewish thought and spirituality - articles and Shiurim in the Yeshiva site
 Joseph Isaac Lifshitz, "Towards a Modern Idea of Charity", Conversations On Philanthropy
 University at Buffalo Research Guide of Jewish Thought

 
Jewish culture
Judaic studies